Manit Joura (born 5 June 1987) is an Indian actor. He is  known for his portrayal of Garv Shinde in Star Plus' Mujhse Kuchh Kehti...Yeh Khamoshiyaan, Jaiwant Rane in Life OK's SuperCops vs Supervillains, Rishabh Luthra in Zee TV's Kundali Bhagya, and Harsh Shastri in Dangal's Prem Bandhan.

Career
Joura was seen on television in the Star Plus reality show Aaja Mahi Vay. He then appeared in television shows like Zee TV's 12/24 Karol Bagh and Ram Milaayi Jodi, and MTV India's Rush.

Joura made the transition from television to films with his debut in Yash Raj Films' Band Baaja Baaraat, directed by Maneesh Sharma. He got an opportunity to work in a German film titled The Girl With The Indian Emerald, directed by Michael Karen. He played the main lead in Mujhse Kuchh Kehti...Yeh Khamoshiyaan on Star Plus.

In 2014, he featured in Life OK's crime detective supernatural series SuperCops vs Supervillains in the role of sub-inspector Jaiwant Rane.

In 2016, he appeared in the film Love Shagun.

Since 2017, he is seen in the role of Rishabh Luthra in Zee TV's most viewed and flagship show Kundali Bhagya.

From 2020 to 2021, he was seen as Harsh Shastri in Dangal's Prem Bandhan. In February 2022, Joura was seen in Colors TV's Naagin 6 as Professor.

Filmography

Films

Television

Web series

Music videos

References

External links
 
 

Living people
1987 births
21st-century Indian male actors
Indian male film actors
Indian male television actors
Male actors in Hindi cinema
Male actors in Hindi television
Punjabi people
Actors from Mumbai